Elizur H. Prindle (May 6, 1829 – October 7, 1890) was a U.S. Representative from New York.

Biography
Prindle was born in Newtown, Connecticut on May 6, 1829.  He was raised in Unadilla, New York, completed preparatory studies, and attended the local academy in Homer, New York.

He studied law with his cousin, Horace Gerald Prindle of Unadilla, was admitted to the bar in 1854 and began to practice.

Prindle later moved to Norwich, New York, where he continued to practice law.  Originally a Whig, and later a Republican, he was district attorney of Chenango County, New York from 1860 to 1862.

At the start of the American Civil War he was one of several leading citizens in Norwich who worked to raise a company for the Union Army, which was mustered in as Company H, 17th New York Volunteer Infantry.  Later in the war he took part in raising a company which was mustered in as part of 114th New York Volunteer Infantry.

He was a member of the New York State Assembly (Chenango Co., 1st D.) in 1863, and a delegate to the New York State Constitutional Convention of 1867–1868.

Prindle was elected as a Republican to the 42nd United States Congress, holding office from March 4, 1871 to March 3, 1873.  After leaving Congress Prindle resumed the practice of law.

He died in Norwich on October 7, 1890, and was interred in Norwich's Mount Hope Cemetery.

References

External links

Sources

Books

1829 births
1890 deaths
Republican Party members of the United States House of Representatives from New York (state)
19th-century American politicians